Xie Feng (born April 1964) is a Chinese diplomat and politician who is currently a Vice Minister of Foreign Affairs, and is responsible for specifically managing China's relationship with the United States. Previously he was the commissioner of the Office of China's Foreign Ministry in the Hong Kong S.A.R. Xie is a graduate of the China Foreign Affairs University. He previously served as the Director-General of the Department of North American and Oceanian Affairs, for the Ministry of Foreign Affairs (MFA), as well as the Chinese Ambassador to Indonesia.

Personal life
Xie is married and has a son.

References

1964 births
Chinese diplomats
Living people
China Foreign Affairs University alumni